Shanghang is a county in southwest Fujian Province, China, bordering Guangdong Province to the southwest. It is under the administration of the prefecture-level city of Longyan.

Transportation
Part of Shanghang County is accessed by China National Highway 319, coming west from Xinluo, the municipal seat. The county seat, conventionally called Shanghang itself but officially Linjiang Town, is reached by Route 205.  The Ganzhou–Longyan Railway passes through western Shanghang.

Tourism
The county's most famous cultural-historical attraction is in the town of Gutian, namely the site of the Gutian Congress in December 1929.

Administration
The county administers 17 towns, 3 townships, and 2 ethnic townships.

Towns 
Shanghang County's 17 towns are as follows:

 
 
 
 
 Rentian
 Baisha
 Gutian
 
 Nanyang

Townships 
Shanghang County's 3 townships are as follows:

Ethnic Townships 
Shanghang County's 2 ethnic townships are as follows:

Climate

International cooperation

List of Shanghang County's sister and twin cities:

  Bor, Serbia

Notes and references

External links

 http://www.shanghang.gov.cn/

 
County-level divisions of Fujian
Longyan